Austin Sean Healey (born 26 October 1973 in Wallasey (now part of Merseyside, formerly Cheshire), is a former English rugby union player who played as a utility back for Leicester Tigers, and represented both England and the British & Irish Lions.

He has 51 England caps and 2 Lions caps. He played for England at scrum half, fly-half, fullback and wing, and was often used as a replacement (or substitute) because of his versatility. He is a famously competitive and "outspoken" character, gaining the nickname "The Leicester Lip".

Since retiring he has worked in the media.

Early life and education

Austin attended Bidston Avenue Primary School in Claughton, Birkenhead, during his primary years.  He passed the entrance exam and attended St Anselm's College, Birkenhead (Edmund Rice Trust) then Leeds Polytechnic.

His Youth Rugby was with Birkenhead Park FC where he returned with His Big Tackle Programme in 2009 which featured Park's Junior Colts.

Rugby career

Early career
Healey played for England U21 in 1992 and went on to represent England A and the Barbarians '96 tour of Japan. After spells at Waterloo and Orrell, Healey initially signed for Leicester as a scrum half, having played at wing and outside centre for Orrell. He made his full England début against Ireland during the 1997 Five Nations tournament, and toured with the British Lions in 1997, making two appearances.

He has played in  Five/Six Nations tournaments (‘98-'02) and in the 1999 World Cup. In the 1999/00 season he was voted both Leicester Tigers' and Allied Dunbar's Player of the Season. 

Leicester coach Bob Dwyer switched him to the wing to accommodate Fijian Waisale Serevi at scrum half. Healey was then selected on the wing for England.

After an injury to Tigers' South African fly-half Joel Stransky, and the unsuitability of others such as Pat Howard and Andy Goode to fill the role, Healey was switched to fly-half. In this position, however, he was unable to make much of an international impression, his sole appearance at fly-half coming in the 2000 tour to South Africa in the first test, after Jonny Wilkinson fell victim to food poisoning.

In 2001 he made the break during the Heineken Cup final that resulted in the winning try - Healey had started the match at scrum half with Andy Goode at 10, but was switched to fly-half in the closing minutes. He also scored the second and decisive try against Munster when Tigers retained the cup the following year.

His form for Tigers during the 2001 season, was rewarded with a call up to England's starting line-up during the Six Nations, and selection for the British & Irish Lions squad to tour Australia, where he put in some good performances for the mid-week team but missed out on further caps due to injury.

However, for many people the abiding memory of this tour will be the controversy caused by his comments on Wallaby lock Justin Harrison in his column in the Guardian. The comments backfired after Harrison was selected to make his debut for the Third and deciding test of the series, and stole a crucial lineout - sealing the series victory for Australia. There was some suggestion that Healey's comments had served as motivation for the Wallabies team.

On his return from Australia he played in every game for England until he was rested for the summer 2002 tour to Argentina, showing his versatility by starting at fullback, scrum half, and wing and came on twice as a replacement.

He returned to international action appearing as a replacement in all three of the following season's autumn internationals when England recorded a series of victories over Australia, New Zealand and South Africa.

Healey flew out to Australia as injury cover for the victorious 2003 Rugby World Cup, however he was never officially added to the squad after certain players recovered, meaning he was unable to pick up a medal for the success despite flying out to Australia.

2004/2005 season

In the 2004/05 season Healey hit form again, and with the failings of the England backline, there were calls for him to be reinstated to ignite it. England coach Andy Robinson humoured the press that there was a chance of a recall, but it never came. Instead Healey turned his attention to the 2005 Lions' tour. He was included in the long list, but not the tour party (having not played international rugby for 3 years). He wrote a column for the Guardian on the tour, which included the quote 'Have you heard the latest from the Lions' camp? Clive's sending Andy Robinson to a fancy dress party tonight. He's going as a pumpkin, they're hoping when it gets to midnight he'll turn into a real coach!'

2005/2006 season
Tigers finished top of the league. A notable performance for Healey was Away at Wasps, where he scored in the last minute to steal a draw. However, Wasps hammered Tigers in the final.
In the 05/06 season, Healey was handed club vice-captaincy and regularly captained the team from scrum half and fly half during the international period. He looked back to near his best form and pressed both Harry Ellis and Andy Goode out of their respective regular slots of 9 and 10 at different times throughout the season. Leicester made the premiership final again and were beaten by Sale Sharks, Healey claims to have thrown his silver medal away in disgust at the end of the game, claiming that he didn't do 'losers medals'.

Retirement
Following retirement from Leicester Tigers at the end of the 2005/6 season, Healey planned to start a new career as a banker with Credit Suisse and to also continue working as a BBC analyst.

Television appearances
Healey competed in the sixth series of the BBC competition series Strictly Come Dancing with professional dancer Erin Boag. He was eliminated in week 12 of the competition to come 4th overall.

He joined Gary Lineker on Who Wants to Be a Millionaire? Christmas Special, on 23 December 2008. Together they won £50,000 for their chosen charity - Nicholls Spinal Injury Foundation.

Healey presented The Big Tackle on ITV in March 2009, aimed at promoting and assisting rugby clubs around the country. In January 2009, he obtained his basic coaching qualifications, in order to put him in a better position from which to advise clubs. During the filming, he returned to his roots and visited his former local club, Birkenhead Park. Some of the other teams that he coached on the series included; Bristol Barbarians, Witney Angels RFC, Rosslyn Park, and University of Sussex.

He competed on show one of the new series of Beat the Star in April 2009. He won 4/8 games, and ended up with 22 points overall, beating his opponent; Factory Manager, Glenn Clarke, who had 14 points overall.

Healey appeared as one of the team captains for the second series of Hole in the Wall along with ex-EastEnders star Joe Swash.

Austin is the host of the ITV gameshow The Fuse, which began on 13 July 2009.

He also appeared on BBC gameshow, Mastermind, on 4 January 2013. His specialist subject was Everton Football Club.

Autobiography
Healey's autobiography, Lions, Tigers and Roses, was published by Oxford University Press in 2001.

See also
 List of top English points scorers and try scorers

References

External links
Leicester profile
Lions profile
Sporting Heroes profile

BBC News Austin Healey retires
BBC News The world according to Healey
Bishop's Stortford Observer - National hero becomes a local hero

1973 births
Living people
Alumni of Leeds Beckett University
Birkenhead Park FC players
British & Irish Lions rugby union players from England
England international rugby union players
English rugby union players
Leicester Tigers players
Orrell R.U.F.C. players
People educated at St. Anselm's College
People from Wallasey
Rugby union players from Wallasey
Rugby union scrum-halves
Waterloo R.F.C. players